The Special Book Award of China (中华图书特殊贡献奖) is an annual award established by the State Press and Publication Administration of the People's Republic of China to recognize foreign translators, writers and publishers who have made significant contributions to introducing China, translating and publishing Chinese books, and promoting cultural exchanges between China and foreign countries. The awards have been made annually since 2005, and are announced around the time of the Beijing International Book Fair. 

"The awards are China's top publication prize that honors foreigners for making great contributions to the introduction and promotion of China, Chinese culture and Chinese publications to the world."

Recipients

2021 (15th year) - 15 awards 
The 15 recipients were:

 Jerusha Hull McCormack, Ireland
 Maxime Vias, French
 David Ferguson, UK
 Laurence Brahm, USA
 Terry Robinson, UK
 Michael Lackner, Germany
 Boldbaatar Dorgsuren, Mongolia
 Syed Hasan Javed, Pakistan
 Veronica Bonilla, Ecuador
 Lee Hee Ok, Korea
 Long Anzhi, USA
 Lang Yu, Germany
 Hishinuma Yoshiaki, Japan
 Igor Radev, North Macedonia
 Burov Vladilen, Russia 
 Mesfer Falah Alsubaly, Saudi Arabia
 Phua Kok Khoo, Singapore

2020 (14th year) - 15 awards 
The 15 recipients were:
 Gustavo Alejandro Girado
 Hamar Imre, Hungary
 Grzegorz Kolodko, Poland
 Kobzev Artem Igorevich, Russia
 Do Tien Sam, Vietnam
 Nama Didier Dieudonne, Cameroon
 Giorgio Casacchia, Italy
 Baktygul Rysbaevna Kalambekova, Kyrgyzstan
 Lennart Lundberg, Sweden
 Nicky Harman, UK
 William H. Nienhauser, Jr., USA
 Niels Peter Thomas, Germany
 Pierre Herzel Lavi, Israel
 Bassam Chebaro, Lebanon
 Duretic Jagos, Syria

2019 (13th year) - 12 awards 
The recipients included:
 Bonnie Suzanne McDougall, Australian translator and academic.
 Daniel Bell, Canadian academic, author of The China Model: Political Meritocracy and the Limits of Democracy.
 Yuri Tavrovskiy, Russian historian, author of Xi Jinping: Governance Thought in Shape, the first book published in Russia about paramount leader Xi Jinping.
 Ioan Budura, Romanian translator, translator of two volumes of Xi Jinping: The Governance of China.
 Fabian Lebenglik, Argentinian publisher, president of Adriana Hidalgo Editora.
 Sotiris Chalikias, Greek translator of Chinese philosophy.
 András Sándor Kocsis, Hungarian publisher, including The Hungary Chinese and Chinese Hungary Dictionary.
 Abbas Kdaimy, Iraqi translator and editor, translator of Xi Jinping: Governance of China vol. 1 into Arabic.
 Yuri Pines, Israeli academic, author of Envisioning Eternal Empire: Chinese Political Thought Of The Warring States Era.
 Seken Aday, Kazakh academic and translator, especially of Chinese social scientists.
 Hong Jungsun, Korean academic and publisher, including Chinese Modern Literature and Modernisation.
 Leopold Moravcik. Slovak writer, including China on the Long March.
Youth awards were presented to:
 Yara El Masri, Egypt.
 Stefan Christ, German translator of contemporary Chinese theatre.
 Kiran Gautam, Nepali.

2018 (12th year) - 15 awards 
The recipients included:
 Andrzej Kacperski, Polish publisher. 
 Staburova Jelena, Latvian researcher of Chinese language and literature.
 The Nepali translator of Xi Jinping: The Governance of China, vol. 1.
 The Uzbek translator of Xi Jinping: The Governance of China, vol. 1.
 Kalmar Eva, Hungarian literary translator of Journey to the West and other works.
 Olivia Milburn, British translator of spy novelist Mai Jia's works Decoded and In the Dark.
 Balan Luminita Rodica, Romanian translator.

2017 (11th year) - 20 awardsForeign translators, writers recognised for promoting Chinese culture, Chinaculture.org, 2017-08-23. http://en.chinaculture.org/2017-08/23/content_1059029.htm 
Special Book Award of China award (16) and Special Book Award of China for Young Scholars (4). The recipients included:
 Richard Charkin, British publisher.
 Iljaz Spahiu, Albanian translator.
 Alicia Relinque, Spanish translator.
 Paul White, English translator.
 Petko Hinov, Bulgarian sinologist, translator of Dream of the Red Chamber into Bulgarian.
 Harold Weldon, Australian Publisher

2016 (10th year)

2015 (9th year) - 20 awards 
 Colin Patrick Mackerras, Australian Sinologist and writer.
 John Makeham, Australian translator and professor of Sinology.
 Lisa Carducci, Canadian writer.
 Francois Cheng, Chinese French translator and writer.
 Joël Bellassen, French Sinologist.
 Helwig Schmidt-Glintzer, German Sinologist. 
 Wilt Idema, Dutch translator and Sinologist.
 Keo Mackaphonh, Laotian writer.
 Menerel Chimedtseye, Mongolian translator and professor. 
 Adam Marszalek, Polish publisher. 
 Leonard Perelomov, Russian Sinologist and translator. 
 Marina Čarnogurská, Slovakian translator. 
 Angel Fernandez, Spanish publisher.
 Robert Baensch, American publisher.
 Guy Salvatore Alitto, American Sinologist.
Youth Awards were presented to:
 Ahmed Sayyid, Egyptian publisher.
 Guang Min, Chinese-Burmese translator.
 Zombory Klara, Hungarian translator.
 Samir Ahmed, Jordanian writer and translator.
 Eric Abrahamsen, American translator.

References

Chinese awards
Translation awards